Hopetoun is a town which serves as the major service centre for the Southern Mallee area of Victoria, Australia.

History
The town was named after the 7th Earl of Hopetoun, the Governor of Victoria from 1889 to 1895 and later the first Governor-General of Australia. The post office opened on 12 September 1891 when the township was established.

The reading was the highest temperature nationwide during the heatwave and also broke the record for the highest temperature in Victoria.

Present
The town has one hotel, a supermarket (IGA), a newsagent, post office, chemist/pharmacist, hairdressers, service station, one Catholic primary school and a combined primary and secondary school, Hopetoun P-12 College, which caters for surrounding townships. It also has a fast food cafe and an op shop. It has a hospital with urgent care, an  acute ward and a residential aged care facility. Hopetoun Airport serves the town.

Local attractions include Wyperfeld National Park, Yarriambiack Creek and Lake Coorong.

Hopetoun-Beulah has football and netball teams competing in the Wimmera League, a golf course, lawn bowls, cricket and tennis competitions, basketball and many other sporting and recreational activities for all ages.

Golfers play at the Hopetoun Golf Club on Rainbow Road.

References

Towns in Victoria (Australia)
1891 establishments in Australia